The Former Residence of Liu Shaoqi or Liu Shaoqi's Former Residence was built in the late Qing Dynasty (1644–1911). It is located in Huaminglou Town of Ningxiang, Hunan, China.

History
In 1796, in the first year of the age of the Jiaqing Emperor, it was built by Liu Shaoqi's forebear.

In 1898, Liu Shaoqi was born here.

On its opening late in 1959, it was listed as a "Historical and Cultural Sites Protected at the Provincial Level".

In May 1961, Chinese President Liu Shaoqi and his wife, first lady Wang Guangmei returned to Hunan and they lived here. During the Great Leap Forward, Liu Shaoqi handed out their own daily necessities to farmers.

In 1966, during the Cultural Revolution, the house was broken down by the Red Guards and the cultural relics were stolen. On October 1, 1966, the site was closed.

In February 1980, President Liu Shaoqi was rehabilitated. The People's Government of Hunan Province and the People's Government of Ningxiang rebuilt the house. On March 5, it was opened to the public again.

In 1982, China's leader Deng Xiaoping wrote "Liu Shao-qi's Former Residence" on the horizontal tablet.

In January 1988, it was listed as a "Major Historical and Cultural Site Protected at the National Level" by the State Council of China.

Gallery

References

Bibliography

External links

Buildings and structures in Ningxiang
Tourist attractions in Changsha
Traditional folk houses in Hunan
Major National Historical and Cultural Sites in Hunan
1796 establishments in China
National first-grade museums of China
Historic house museums in China
Museums in Hunan
Liu Shaoqi